ʻAta Maama Tu’utafaiva (born 25 May 1997 in Haʻafeva) is a Tongan athlete who has represented Tonga at the Commonwealth Games, Pacific Games and Pacific Mini Games.

At the 2015 Pacific Games in Port Moresby, Papua New Guinea she won bronze in the shot put. At the 2017 Pacific Mini Games in Port Vila she won gold in the shot put. In 2018 she competed as a finalist in the 2018 Commonwealth Games. At the 2019 Pacific Games in Apia she won gold in the shot put with her personal best of 16.61 m. She also won bronze in the Discus. Previously, her best was 15.36m, made in Gold Coast during the Commonwealth Games’ final. In 2019, she became the Emerging Athlete of the Year – Female for Oceania Athletics Association. She won gold again in the shot put at the 2022 Pacific Mini Games in Saipan, Northern Mariana Islands.

References

1997 births
Living people
Athletes (track and field) at the 2018 Commonwealth Games
Tongan female shot putters
Tongan female discus throwers
People from Haʻapai
Commonwealth Games competitors for Tonga